The women's 4 x 5 kilometre relay at the FIS Nordic World Ski Championships 2013 was held on 28 February 2013.

Results 
The race was started at 12:45.

References

FIS Nordic World Ski Championships 2013
2013 in Italian women's sport